Novara, was the private label brand of bicycles, apparel and bicycle accessories, that was exclusively available through the consumer cooperative REI. The brand was introduced in 1983 and was headquartered in Kent, Washington.  Novara bikes are designed in house; outsourced for manufacturing, then finished by REI.

The Novara brand was also used for REI's line of cycling clothing and accessories.

Since 2008, REI has settled both in and out of court with an undisclosed number of individuals who suffered injuries while riding Novara bicycles.  

In 2016, REI announced the Novara line would be discontinued.

Models

Types with model amount in parentheses.

Kids' Bikes (13)
 Novara Pulse
 Ponderosa 24"
 Tractor 24"
 Moxie 24"
 Duster 6
 Pixie 6
 Duster Single Speed
 Pixie SS
 Stinger 16
 Firefly 16"
 Stinger 12"
 Firefly 12"
 Afterburner SS Single-Speed Trailer Bike
Road Bikes (7)
 Verita
 Strada
 Carema Pro
 Novara Divano
 Novara Carema
 Novara Express
 Novara Express XX
Novara Trionfo
 Novara Zeno (650C)
Touring Bikes (2)
 Randonee
 Safari
Recreation bikes (6)
 Forza
 Fiona
 Corsa
 Mia
 Jaunt Bike
 Jaunt XX
City Bikes (5)
 E.T.A.
 Novara Buzz
 Novara Buzz One
 Novara Fusion
 Novara Gotham
 Novara Transfer
Mountain Bikes (6)
 Ponderosa 29
 Tupelo 29
 Tupelo 27.5
 Matador 29
 Bonanza
 Bonita
 Portal 
 Pika
 Novara Method 1.0
 Novara Method 2.0

References
Specific references:

General references:

King County Rolls Out Green Bike Program from The Stranger, August 27, 2008
Dahon and REI Novara Folding Bicycles Recalled Due to Fall Hazard from the U.S. Consumer Product Safety Commission
Choosing a Bike - Mid Range Tourers from the Adventure Cycling Guide (UK)
Review: Novara Randonee: It's a Wrap from Bicycle Times magazine
Kiplinger's Personal Finance August 2002, page 75

External links
REI Bicycles site
REI Bike Your drive site

Cycle manufacturers of the United States
Companies based in Kent, Washington
American brands
Store brands
Sporting goods brands
1983 establishments in Washington (state)